Gayny (Gajna) is a rural locality (a settlement) and the administrative center of Gaynsky District of Komi-Permyak Okrug in Perm Krai, Russia, located  north from the town of Kudymkar on the right bank of the Kama River. Population:

History 
It was first mentioned in 1579. This year is considered the official foundation of the settlement. It was granted urban-type settlement status on January 2, 1963, but was demoted back to a rural locality in 1998.

In 1926, it had 263 households and a population of 1,051 (including 1,008 Russians, 39 Komi-Permyaks, and 4 people of others ethnicities).

Climate
Gayny has subarctic climate (Köppen climate classification Dfc), with warm summers and very cold winters.

References

Rural localities in Gaynsky District
Cherdynsky Uyezd